The Swedish Olympic Committee (SOC) is the Swedish National Olympic Committee (NOC). The Swedish Olympic Committee organize the Swedish participation in the Olympics, choose the participants and run the "Elitprogrammet".

Members of the committee are 45 sports federations, which elect the Executive Council composed of the president and twelve members.

History 
The Swedish Olympic Committee was founded on 27 April 1913 and recognized by International Olympic Committee the same year.

Presidents 
The Swedish Olympic Committee has had the following presidents:

Notable names of the International Olympic Committee

Executive committee 
The committee of the SOC is represented by: 
 President: Mats Årjes
 Vice Presidents: Per Palmström, Maria Damgren-Nilsson
 Secretary General: Åsa Edlund Jönsson
 IOC members: Gunilla Lindberg, Stefan Holm
 Members: Katarina Henriksson, Malin Eggertz Forsmark, Olle Dahlin, Anders Larsson, Hans von Uthmann, Anette Norberg, Anna Laurell Nash, Stefan Holm, Peter Reinebo

Member federations 
The Swedish National Federations are the organizations that coordinate all aspects of their individual sports. They are responsible for training, competition and development of their sports. There are currently 38 Olympic Summer and seven Winter Sport Federations and the 17 Non-Olympic Sport federations in Sweden.

Olympic Sport federations

Non-Olympic Sport federations

See also 
Sweden at the Olympics

References

External links 
Official website

Sweden at the Olympics
National Olympic Committees
1913 establishments in Sweden
Oly
Sports organizations established in 1913